The Roxheim Synagogue was a synagogue built in 1889 in Roxheim, Germany. The unrestored building was located on Bobenheimer Strasse and was demolished in the 2010s.

History 
The Jewish community in Roxheim had previously used a smaller synagogue, which was destroyed in a heavy flood of the river Rhine in 1882. In 1889, a new building was consecrated in the same location. It was taller than the predecessor. There was a teacher's apartment on the ground floor and the prayer room upstairs. The documents report a painting "with rosettes, friezes and decorative lines". Parts of the Torah shrine were gilded.

After the First World War, the Roxheim Jewish community had insufficient adult men to maintain a minyan. The community dissolved around 1930. The synagogue was sold and converted into a residential building. Because of the change of ownership, it was not damaged during the Nazi era.

The building, on Bobenheimer Strasse, was within sight of the Catholic parish church of St. Maria Magdalena from 1834. The building was not listed as a monument. The preservation status of the building ended in 1985. It was the last example of a synagogue in the northern Rhein-Pfalz-Kreis and in the eastern part of the former district of Frankenthal.

References 
 Landesamt für Denkmalpflege Rheinland-Pfalz: „...und dies ist die Pforte des Himmels“ Synagogen – Rheinland-Pfalz. Saarland. 2005. p. 118–119.

External links 
 Roxheim (Gemeinde Bobenheim-Roxheim, Rhein-Pfalz-Kreis) Jüdische Geschichte / Synagoge from Alemannia Judaica. (in German) 

Religious buildings and structures in Rhineland-Palatinate
Former synagogues in Germany
Synagogues completed in 1889
Demolished buildings and structures in Germany
Buildings and structures demolished in 2017